Wayne Blair (born 28 November 1971) is an Australian writer, actor and director. He was on both sides of the camera in Redfern Now. He is also the director of the feature film The Sapphires.

Early life
Blair was born in Taree, New South Wales, to Julie and Bob Blair and has two older sisters, Janet and Mandy. He is an Aboriginal Australian and he describes himself as a Batjala, Mununjali, Wakkawakka man.

As Blair's father was a soldier the family moved around. While Blair was still young, his father was posted to Woodside in South Australia. When he was a teenager, Blair's family were sent to Rockhampton. In Rockhampton he excelled at cricket and rugby, then later became interested in acting and dancing at school. Blair had a job as a tour guide at Rockhampton's Dreamtime Cultural Centre, where he was also one of the dancers. He went on to do a marketing degree at Central Queensland University, though his elective subjects included comic drama and Australian drama. He briefly went to Sydney to play rugby league for the Canterbury Bulldogs under-21s. After a failed audition for NIDA in 1992, he eventually did a three-year course at the Queensland University of Technology in acting.

Career highlights
Blair's first recorded on-screen appearance was in a 1997 Australian TV film called The Tower. The following year he appeared on All Saints and Wildside. He has also appeared in Water Rats and Fireflies. 1998 was also the year he was one of the first four film makers to be mentored under the Metro Screen Indigenous Mentor Scheme for which he made a short film called Fade 2 Black. Ten years later he was to become a mentor himself under the same scheme.

Blair starred in the original stage production of Tony Briggs's play, The Sapphires in 2005. This play was later turned into a filmscript to be directed by Blair.

In 2007 he starred as Othello for Bell Shakespeare, a show that toured Australia with stops at Sydney, Melbourne and Canberra as well as other cities. He also directed three episodes of Lockie Leonard with a further four in 2010.

In 2008 Blair directed all thirteen episodes of the Australian children's TV series Double Trouble, about twin Indigenous girls separated at birth. In 2009 he wrote an episode of the second season of The Circuit. 2010 saw Blair direct four episodes of the Australian-British children's supernatural comedy TV series, Dead Gorgeous. He directed British-Jamaican Debbie Tucker Green's play Dirty Butterfly and co-directed the biographical play, Namatjira, with Scott Rankin who also wrote the play, both plays at Sydney's Belvoir St Theatre. He was also chosen in the same year as one of the stars of the Sydney Theatre Company's revival of Sam Shepard's True West, directed by Philip Seymour Hoffman.

Wayne Blair was awarded the Bob Maza Fellowship for 2011 by Screen Australia to provide opportunities for career development. 2012 was a big year which saw the making of his hit film, The Sapphires, which brought him recognition around the world with a very positive response at Cannes. Later in the year he starred in three episodes of the ABC's TV drama series, Redfern Now and directed another of the episodes. To finish the year Blair was included in Variety Magazine's top ten directors to watch in 2013.

Blair has occasionally worked on projects outside of Australia, including 2015's Septembers of Shiraz; a US production shot in Bulgaria, and a 2017 made for television remake of the American classic Dirty Dancing.

Filmography

Films

Television

Awards and recognition
2005: Nominated for Best Screenplay in a Short Film at the AFI Awards for his work on The Djarn Djarns
2011: Recipient of the Bob Maza Fellowship, which recognises emerging acting talent and support professional development for Indigenous actors
2012: Nominated for Best Direction for The Sapphires
July 2021: Invited to join the Academy of Motion Picture Arts and Sciences

References

External links
 

Living people
1971 births
20th-century Australian male actors
21st-century Australian male actors
AACTA Award winners
Australian film directors
Australian male film actors
Australian male stage actors
Australian male television actors
Australian television directors
Central Queensland University alumni
Indigenous Australian filmmakers
Indigenous Australian male actors
Indigenous Australian writers
Male actors from New South Wales
People from Taree
Queensland University of Technology alumni
Writers from New South Wales